Liu Hao (born 6 September 1993) is a Chinese sprint canoeist.

He won a gold medal at the 2019 ICF Canoe Sprint World Championships. He also competed in the 2020 Tokyo Olympics and won the silver medals in both men's C-2 1000 metres and men's C-1 1000 metres.

References

1993 births
Living people
Chinese male canoeists
ICF Canoe Sprint World Championships medalists in Canadian
Sportspeople from Yunnan
Asian Games medalists in canoeing
Canoeists at the 2018 Asian Games
Asian Games gold medalists for China
Medalists at the 2018 Asian Games
Olympic canoeists of China
Canoeists at the 2020 Summer Olympics
Medalists at the 2020 Summer Olympics
Olympic medalists in canoeing
Olympic silver medalists for China